The University of Oviedo (Asturian: Universidá d'Uviéu) is a public university in Asturias (Spain). It is the only university in the region. It has three campus and research centres, located in Oviedo, Gijón and Mieres.

History
The University of Oviedo was established under the terms and conditions of the will of Archbishop Fernando de Valdés Salas (1483–1568), who was the General Inquisitor under Philip II of Spain, and funded by his estate. In 1574 Pope Gregory XIII granted the papal bull to create the university and in 1604  Philip III issued its charter. It first opened for the teaching of classes on September 21, 1608.

The ancient university had three faculties: the Faculty of Arts, which every student had to graduate from in order to continue his training in one of the other; and the Faculties of Theology and Law, sometimes known as the higher faculties.

After the French invasion of Spain the Historical Building of the university was occupied by invading troops and lectures were suspended until the War ended in 1812.

During the 19th century, a group of liberal professors tried to bring the university closer to the working class with the Extensión Universitaria (a popular education programme sponsored by the institution). However, this goal was not fully achieved, and on October 13, 1934, during the Socialist-led miners revolt in Asturias, strikers set fire to the university (including its Library and the Art Gallery) because it was seen as a bourgeois symbol. It was rebuilt after the Spanish Civil War (1936–1939).

The number of faculties has multiplied in modern university, both through subdivisions of the traditional four faculties, and through the absorption of academic disciplines which have developed within originally vocational schools, in areas such as engineering or nursing.

Nowadays, the university has 31 faculties and professional schools, offering degrees and diplomas in over 150 fields of study.

Schools and colleges
School of Law (since 1608), Teaching and Education (1845), Chemistry (1848), Polytechnic School of Mieres (1855), Jovellanos Faculty of Commerce, Tourism and Social Sciences (1866), Gijón Polytechnic School of Engineering (1888), Philosophy and Letters (1892), Economy and Business (1908), Teaching and  Geology (1958), Mining Engineering (1959), Biology (1961), Medicine and Health Sciences (1968), Merchant Marine (1979), School of Computer Engineering (1982), Sciences (1990), Psychology (1991)

Departments
Experimental Sciences: Analytic and Physical-Chemistry, Chemical Engineering and Environment Technologies, Mathematics, Organic and Inorganic Chemistry, Physics, Statistics and Operations Research and Mathematics Education.
Health Sciences: Biochemistry and Molecular Biology, Biology of Organisms and Systems, Functional Biology, Medicine, Morphology and Cellular Biology, Surgery and Medical-Surgical Specialities.
Engineering: Telecommunication, Computer Sciences, Construction and Manufacturing Engineering, Electrical, Electronical, Computers and Systems Engineering, Energy, Materials Science and Metallurgical Engineering, Mining Working and Prospecting, Nautical Science and Technologies.
Social Sciences and Law: Accounting, Applied Economy, Basic Legal Sciences, Business Administration, Education Sciences, Economy, Private and Companies Law, Psychology, Public Law, Quantitative Economy, Sociology.
Humanities: Anglo-German and French Philology, Art and Music History, Classical and Romance Philology, Geography, History, Philosophy, Spanish Philology.

Facilities 

The school has a large number of places in different classrooms, total counted 6 classrooms in the building, with spaces ranging from the 171 seats in the classroom with greater capacity, up to 75 seats in the lower-capacity classroom. In addition to these classrooms, there is a room hold up to 112 places, which are usually done lectures and presentations both subjects, as final projects. 
Special mention also the different laboratories that school has a total of 15 laboratories. Included in this equipment of various kinds, both PC and MAC.

Staff
Rector: Santiago García Granda (since May 2016)

General Secretary: Eva María Cordero González

General Manager: Ana Isabel Caro Muñoz

Vice-rectorates:
Delegate for Coordination and University Strategy: Xabiel García Pañeda
Vice-rectorate for Academic Organization: Juan José del Coz Díaz
Vice-rectorate for Research: José Ramón Obeso Suárez 
Vice-rectorate for University Extension and International Development: Francisco José Borge López
Vice-rectorate for Student Affairs: Elisa Miguélez González
Vice-rectorate for Material and Technological Resources:  Marta María Hernando Álvarez
Vice-rectorate for Crosscutting Actions and Enterprise Cooperation: Eugenia Suárez Serrano

Social Council: Ladislao Azcona (President), representatives of political parties, trade-unions, employers, etc.
Council of Government : Rectoral Council and Representatives from University Staff, Faculties, Schools and Departments
University Staff: Representatives of Professors, Administration Staff and Students
Rectoral Council: Rector together with the Vice-Chancellors

Notable alumni
 Antonio Arrúe Zarauz, Basque cultural activist and Carlist politician
Antón de Marirreguera, Asturian-language writer
Melchor de Navarra y Rocafull, viceroy of Peru
Gaspar Melchor de Jovellanos, Enlightenment statesman, author and philosopher
Agustín Argüelles, politic
Faustino Rodríguez-San Pedro Díaz-Argüelles, Minister of Finance
Rafael del Riego, general and liberal politician
Leopoldo Alas Clarín, journalist and writer
Armando Palacio Valdés, novelist and critic
Melquíades Álvarez, politic
Antonio Flores de Lemus, economist and politic
Ramón Pérez de Ayala, novelist
Alejandro Casona, poet and playwright
Gonzalo Torrente Ballester, novelist
Luis Suárez Fernández, historian
Carlos Bousoño, poet
Ángel González, poet
José Manuel Castañón, writer
Santiago Vera-Rivera, composer
Gil Carlos Rodríguez Iglesias, former judge at the European Court of Justice
Olvido García Valdés, poet and essayist
Luis Martínez Noval, Minister of Labour and Social Security (1990–1993)
Gustavo Suárez Pertierra, minister of Education and Science (1993–1995) and Defence (1995–1996)
Gaspar Llamazares, leader of United Left Coalition (Izquierda Unida) (2000–2008)
Miguel Álvarez-Fernández, musician
Fernando Suárez González, Minister of Labour (1974–1975)
Víctor García de la Concha, Director of Royal Spanish Academy
Salvador Gutiérrez Ordóñez, linguist
Alejandro Fernández Sordo, lawyer and politician
Regino Olivares, lawyer
Xaviel Vilareyo, author
Celso Arango, physician (psychiatrist)
Darin Paine, development officer

Notable professors
Luis Alfonso de Carvallo, historian, rector of San Gregorio College
Leopoldo Alas Clarín, journalist and writer
Benito Jerónimo Feijoo, Enlightenment monk and scholar
Rafael Altamira y Crevea, historian and lawyer
Félix de Aramburu y Zuloaga, lawyer and poet
 Matías Barrio y Mier, professor of law 1881–1892, Carlist political leader
Fermín Canella Secades, historian
Nicolás Salmerón y Alonso, politician, President of the First Spanish Republic (1873)
Aniceto Sela Sampil, lawyer
Jesús Arias de Velasco, lawyer
José María Gil-Robles, politician, leader of the Right Wing under the II Republic
Torcuato Fernández-Miranda, politician, president of the Spanish Cortes (1975–1977), interim prime minister (1974), vice-prime minister (1973–1974), General Secretary of the National Movement (Movimiento Nacional) (1969–1974)
Carmina Virgili - first woman Professor
Vicente Alberto Álvarez Areces, President of the Principality of Asturias from 1999 to 2011
Luis Martínez Noval, minister of Labour and Social Security (1990–1993)
Josep Oliú Creus, economist. President and CEO of Banco Sabadell
Gustavo Bueno, notable philosopher
Eloy Benito Ruano, historian
Juan Ignacio Ruiz de la Peña Solar, historian
Sergio Marqués Fernández, politician, President of the Principality of Asturias from 1995 to 1999
Aurelio González Ovies, poet
Emilio Alarcos Llorach, poet and linguist
Vicente Miguel Gotor Santamaría, chemist
Antonello Novelli, neuroscientist
Paz Andrés Sáenz de Santamaría, lawyer
José Luis García Delgado, economist
M. Teresa Fernández Sánchez, biochemist
José Joaquín Barluenga Mur, chemist
Carlos López Otín, biochemist
Ana Cano, philologist and president of Academy of the Asturian Language

Some honorary doctors
 1967 Severo Ochoa
 1968 Walter Hallstein
 1976 Claudio Sánchez Albornoz
 1982 Ramón Areces
 1982 Günther Wilke
 1985 Rafael Lapesa
 1988 Óscar Arias Sánchez, presidente de Costa Rica
 1991 Federico Mayor Zaragoza
 1992 William Golding
 1995 Lotfi A. Zadeh
 1998 Sheila Sherlock
 2001 Gil Carlos Rodríguez Iglesias
 2007 Ángel González
 2007 Juan José Millás
 2008 Walter Alvarez
 2008 Efim Zelmanov

See also 
 List of early modern universities in Europe

Notes and references

External links

 
 International Students
 School of Computer Science Engineering

 
1574 establishments in Spain
Educational institutions established in the 1570s
Buildings and structures in Asturias
Buildings and structures in Oviedo
Universities and colleges in Spain